Joseph R. Perella (born September 20, 1941) is an American financier.

Early life
Perella was born in Newark, New Jersey, to an accountant. Perella attended Lehigh University on a full scholarship. During his time at Lehigh, Perella was a member of Phi Kappa Theta, Fraternity for men. Following his sophomore year at Lehigh, Perella took several years off before returning and graduating from the university in 1964 with a degree in accounting. After serving in the United States Air Force and the New Jersey Air National Guard from 1964 to 1970, he attended and graduated from Harvard Business School in May 1972 with a Masters in Business Administration.

Career
In the fall of 1972, he was hired as an associate at First Boston, where he worked in the mergers and acquisitions department. He remained with First Boston until 1988 when he teamed up with associate Bruce Wasserstein to create their own mergers and acquisitions advisory business as Wasserstein Perella & Co. Their company was at the forefront of the 1980s/90s boom in corporate takeovers.

Joseph Perella left Wasserstein Perella in 1992/1993 to join Morgan Stanley, where he was first head of mergers and acquisitions, and then the chairman of the Institutional Securities and Investment Banking Group. In 2005, Perella and other top executives resigned from Morgan Stanley in the wake of policy disagreements with Chairman Philip J. Purcell.  Purcell soon resigned following more high level departures from Morgan Stanley.

One of the deals Perella advised on following his departure from Morgan Stanley was advising on the Bank of America takeover of credit card company MBNA.  In November 2005, Perella and former Morgan Stanley banker Terry Meguid announced that they were opening an investment banking boutique.  On June 15, 2006, Perella announced the formation of a new financial services firm, Perella Weinberg Partners, based in New York and London.

Philanthropy
Perella is a Lehigh University trustee. In 2003, he and his wife Amy, a survivor of Hodgkin's disease, donated $10 million to the College of Business and Economics to endow the "Perella Department of Finance" and several faculty positions. They have also an endowed scholarship fund for Lehigh students from the Newark, N.J. area, where Perella grew up. They also supported the construction of Rauch Business Center. In addition, the couple created "The Amy and Joseph Perella Professor of Medicine" at Yale University.  He is also a member of the National Italian American Federation.

References

1941 births
Living people
American financial analysts
American financiers
American people of Italian descent
American philanthropists
Harvard Business School alumni
Lehigh University alumni
United States Air Force airmen
New Jersey National Guard personnel